Abaciscus atmala is a species of moth belonging to the family Geometridae. It was described by Charles Swinhoe in 1894. It is known from the north-eastern Himalayas, Myanmar, Siberut Island and Borneo.

The wingspan is 12–14 mm.

Subspecies
Abaciscus atmala atmala (Himalayas, Myanmar)
Abaciscus atmala smedleyi (L. B. Prout, 1931) (Siberut Island)
Abaciscus atmala flavida Holloway, 1993 (Borneo)

References

Boarmiini
Moths described in 1894
Moths of Asia
Taxa named by Charles Swinhoe